Creswell Colliery F.C. was an English association football club which participated in the Midland Football League and the FA Cup.During the 1954/55 season, Creswell Colliery FC successfully reached the 1st round proper of the FA Cup and were drawn to play Football League opposition Accrington Stanley from the Third Division North. After switching the match to Peel Park, a strong following including the colliery brass band travelled to Accrington on 20 November 1954 where, despite scoring, Creswell lost 7–1.

History

Honours
Central Alliance
Division One champions 1964-65
Sutton & Skegby League
Premier Division champions 1977-78
Midland Counties League
Division One League Cup winners 1981-82
FA Cup 
First Round proper 1954-55

References

Defunct football clubs in Derbyshire
East Midlands Regional League
Central Alliance
Midland Football League (1889)
Northern Counties East Football League
Defunct football clubs in England
Mining association football teams in England